Dionisio, a variant of Dionysius, may refer to:

People

Given name
 Dionisio Lazzari (1617–1689), Italian sculptor and architect
 Dionisio Aguado y García (1784–1849), Spanish classical guitarist and composer
 Papa Isio (1846–1911), Dionisio Magbuelas, Filipino leader of babaylanes
 Dionisio Anzilotti (1867–1950), Italian jurist and judge
 Dionisio Jakosalem (1878–1931), Filipino governor
 Dionisio Carreras (1890–1949), Spanish long-distance runner
 Dionisio Fernández (boxer) (born 1907), Spanish boxer
 Dionisio Mejía (1907–1963), Mexican football forward
 Dionisio Fernández (sport shooter) (born 1921), Argentine sports shooter
 Dionísio Azevedo (1922–1994), Brazilian actor, director, and writer
 Dionisio Romero (born 1936), Peruvian banker
 Dionisio Gutiérrez (born 1959), Guatemalan businessman
 Dionisio D'Aguilar (born 1964), Bahamian politician
 Dionisio Cimarelli (born 1965), Italian sculptor
 Dionísio (footballer, born 1970), Dionísio Domingos Rangel, Brazilian football forward
 Dionisio Cabrera (born 1986), Uruguayan football attacking midfielder
 Díonísio (footballer, born 1988), Díonísio de Oliveira Alves, Brazilian football defensive midfielder

Surname
 John Dionisio (born 1948), American executive chairman for AECOM
 Silvia Dionisio (born 1951), Italian actress
 Joshua Dionisio (born 1994), Brazilian actor
 Simon Dionisio (born 2000), South African rugby player

Places
 Dionísio, Minas Gerais, municipality in Brazil

Other uses
 Dionisio R. De Leon Express, Philippine bus company

See also
 San Dionisio (disambiguation)